= Cult icon =

Cult icon may refer to:

- Cultural icon
- Cult image
- Cult following
